Al-Ansar Football Club is a Saudi Arabian professional multi-sports club based in Medina that plays in the Saudi Second Division, the third tier of Saudi football. It was founded in 1953. The club play their home games at the Al-Ansar Club Stadium in Medina. Al-Ansar have a rivalry with city neighbors Ohod, and the two sides contest the Medina derby.

Honours
Saudi First Division
Winners (2): 1985–86, 1999–2000
Runners-up (4): 1995–96, 1997–98, 2003–04, 2010–11

Current squad 
As of Saudi Second Division:

Personnel

Current technical staff

External links
 Official website
 2011–12 Profile at slstat.com

References

 
Ansar
Ansar
Ansar
Ansar